The Gandhara grave culture, also called Swat culture, or Swat Protohistoric Graveyards Complex, emerged c. 1400 BCE and lasted until 800 BCE, as recent fieldwork, along with subsequent analyses, have shown there are no burials with these features after 800 BCE. It is found in Middle Swat River course, even though earlier research considered it to be expanded to the Valleys of  Dir, Kunar, Chitral, and  Peshawar in modern day Pakistan.  It has been regarded as a token of the Indo-Aryan migrations, but has also been explained by local cultural continuity. Backwards projections, based on ancient DNA analyses, suggest ancestors of Swat culture people mixed with a population coming from the Inner Asian Mountain Corridor, which carried Steppe ancestry, sometime between 1900 and 1500 BCE.

Location and characteristics
Relevant finds, artifacts found primarily in graves, were distributed along the banks of the Swat and Dir rivers in the north, Taxila in the southeast, along the Gomal River to the south. Simply-made terracotta figurines were buried with the pottery, and other items are decorated with simple dot designs.

Re-evaluation of the findings suggests this so-called Gandhara Grave Culture was actually a burial tradition, spread across a wide geographical area, rather than a specific culture. There are more than thirty cemeteries of this tradition found in Swat and surrounding valleys of Dir, Buner, Malakand, Chitral, and in the Vale of Peshawar to the south in Pakistan, featuring cist graves, where large stone slabs were used to line the pit, above which another large flat stone was laid forming a roof over them. Related settlement sites were also found which helped to know more about these people's life and death.

Anthropomorphic urns with cremation remains were not frequently found in graves, and the most common pottery within these graves is Burnished Grey Ware and Burnished Red Ware, along with human terracotta figurines. However, later graves are more elaborate featuring more items, various graves with horse remains and horse furniture were also reported.

Origins
The Gandhara grave culture may be an artifact of the Indo-Aryan migrations, but it may also be explained by regional cultural continuity.

Single burials are characteristic of the early phase, along with bronze objects and pottery within the graves. Cremation is distinctive in the middle phase, and ashes were laid in large jars, often  bearing a human-like face design, this jars were then placed frequently in circular pits, surrounded by objects of bronze, gold and pottery. Multiple burials and fractional remains are found in the late phase, along with iron objects, coeval with the beginning of urban centers of Taxila and Charsadda. However, new research, based on 34 excavated graves in Udegram, and in nearby site of Gogdhara, uncovered two burial phases, the first between 1400 and 1100 cal BCE, and the second from 1000 to 800 cal BCE, with an inter-phase in Gogdhara, from 1200 to 900 cal BCE.

Indo-Aryan migrations
The polished black-gray pottery of Gandhara grave culture during  the Ghalegay IV period, earlier considered to run from 1700-1400 BCE, has been associated with that of other BMAC sites like Dashly in Afghanistan, Tepe Hissar and Tureng Teppe. According to Asko Parpola, the presence of black-red pottery also suggests links with Cemetery H culture in Pakistan. The burial of bodies, the metal pins used got fastening clothes and the terracotta statuettes of females, says Parpola, are similar to those found to the BMAC. The graves during the Ghalegay V period, previously considered to run from 1400-1000 BCE, are connected with those in Vakhsh and Beshkent Valley. Parpola adds that these graves represent a mix of the practices found in northern Bactrian portion of BMAC during the period of 1700-1400 BCE and the Fedorovo Andronovo culture. However, these datings between 1700 and 1000 BCE are currently considered outdated, and Gandhara grave culture has been re-dated to c. 1400 to 800 BCE.

According to Upinder Singh, the Gandhara grave culture is similar to the one in the Ghalegay caves during their V, VI and VII phases. Rajesh Kochhar says it may be associated with early Indo-Aryan speakers as well as the Indo-Aryan migration into the Indian Subcontinent, which came from the Bactria–Margiana region. According to Kochhar, the Indo-Aryan culture fused with indigenous elements of the remnants of the Indus Valley civilization (OCP, Cemetery H) and gave rise to the Vedic Civilization.

Cultural continuity
Asko Parpola argues that the Gandhara grave culture is "by no means identical with the Bronze Age Culture of Bactria and Margiana". According to Tusa, the Gandhara grave culture and its new contributions are "in line with the cultural traditions of the previous period". According to Parpola, in the centuries preceding the Gandhara culture, during the Early Harappan period (roughly 3200–2600 BCE), similarities in pottery, seals, figurines, ornaments etc. document intensive caravan trade between the Indian Subcontinent and Central Asia and the Iranian plateau. Tusa remarks that 

According to Kennedy, who argues for a local cultural continuity, the Gandhara grave culture people shared biological affinities with the population of Neolithic Mehrgarh in Pakistan. This suggests a "biological continuum" between the ancient populations of Timargarha and Mehrgarh. This is contested by Elena E. Kuz'mina, who notes remains that are similar to some from Central Asian populations.

Antonini, Stacul and other scholars argue that this culture is also not related to the Bishkent culture and Vakhsh culture of Tajikistan. However, E. Kuz'mina argues the opposite on the basis of both archaeology and the human remains from the separate cultures.

Genetics 
Narasimhan et al. 2018 analyzed DNA of 362 ancient skeletons from Central and South Asia, including those from the Iron Age grave sites discovered in the Swat valley of Pakistan (between 1200 BCE and 1 CE from Aligrama, Barikot, Butkara, Katelai, Loe Banr, and Udegram). According to them, "there is no evidence that the main BMAC population contributed genetically to later South Asians", and that "Indus Periphery-related people are the single most important source of ancestry" in Indus Valley Civilization and South Asia. They further state that the Swat valley grave DNA analysis provides further evidence of "connections between [Central Asian] Steppe population and early Vedic culture in South Asia".

See also
Pottery in the Indian subcontinent
Chust culture
Barikot

References

Sources

External links
 https://web.archive.org/web/20060908052920/http://pubweb.cc.u-tokai.ac.jp/indus/english/3_1_05.html
 https://web.archive.org/web/20060908052731/http://pubweb.cc.u-tokai.ac.jp/indus/english/3_1_01.html
 https://books.google.com/books?id=x5J9rn8p2-IC&dq=isbn:900416054X&hl=en

Archaeological cultures in India
Archaeological cultures in Pakistan
Archaeological cultures of South Asia
Bronze Age cultures of Asia
Iron Age cultures of Asia
Archaeological cultures in Afghanistan
Indo-Aryan archaeological cultures